Orsa Lake is a lake in the Swedish province Dalarna.  It is connected to Siljan by a  narrow sound, Moranoret. 

Images 

Lakes of Dalarna County